Project Runway Season 3 was the third season of Project Runway, Bravo's successful reality competition for fashion designers.  The third season of the show, with Heidi Klum returning as the host and Tim Gunn as the designers' guide, began airing on July 12, 2006.  This broke tradition from the previous two seasons, which premiered in December, with the finales taking place at Olympus Fashion Week in February.

Season 3 brought in a new set of sponsors, notably Macy's replacing Banana Republic. NBC re-aired the first two episodes of Project Runway 3 five days after their original Bravo airings. The third season also introduced live viewer poll questions.  During the second half-hour of the first airing of each episode, Bravo posed a question to viewers pertaining to the current episode. Viewers could answer through the BravoTV.com website or through cell phone text message.

The winner, Jeffrey Sebelia, received a spread in Elle magazine, a mentorship with INC (Inter-National Concepts) Design, a year of representation by Designers Management Agency, a 2007 Saturn Sky Roadster, and $100,000 to start a clothing line (furnished by TRESemmé haircare).

In 2012, Kayne Gillaspie and Uli Herzner later competed in the second season of the All Stars edition with Kayne placing 9th, and Uli placing 3rd.  In 2013, Mychael Knight and Jeffrey Sebelia competed in the third season of the All Stars edition, with Mychael placing 8th and Jeffrey placing 7th.

Contestants

Designers

 (ages listed are the designers' ages at the time the show was taped in the spring of 2006.)

Models

The 15 models competing for an Elle spread in the third season were:

Challenges 

 The designer won the challenge.
 The designer came in second for that challenge, but did not win.
 The designer had one of the highest scores for that challenge, but did not win.
 The designer had one of the lowest scores for that challenge, but was not eliminated.
 The designer was in the bottom two, but was not eliminated.
 The designer lost and was out of the competition.
 The designer was disqualified from the competition.
 The designer returned to competition and was eliminated for a second time the same episode.
 The designer won Project Runway Season 3.

 : Keith was disqualified due to having fashion pattern books and leaving production for several hours to gain access with the internet.
 : Designers previously eliminated who won a challenge were brought back to compete in this challenge.
 : No contestants were eliminated, and all went on to compete at Fashion Week.
 : Heidi noted that Keith could have won the challenge if he met the full criteria (if he made a garment for his dog), but as he didn't, he received one of the lowest scores.

Model competition 

 The model won Project Runway Season 3.
 The model wore the winning design that challenge.
 The model wore the losing design that challenge.
 The model was eliminated.
 The model was eliminated, but was brought back.
 The model withdrew from the competition.

Designer legend
Alison Kelly: AL
Angela Keslar: AN
Bonnie Dominguez: BD
Bradley Baumkirchner: BB
Jeffrey Sebelia: JS
Katherine Gerdes: KG
Kayne Gillaspie: KY
Keith Michael: KM
Laura Bennett: LB
Malan Breton: MB
Michael Knight: MK
Robert Best: RB
Stacey Estrella: SE
Uli Herzner: UH
Vincent Libretti: VL

Model selection process:
 Episode 1: Models were randomly assigned to designers.
 Episodes 2 and 4:  Designers chose their models, with the winner of the previous challenge choosing first and the other designers choosing in random order.
 Episode 3 and 6: The winner of the previous challenge was allowed to change his model. All other designers kept their previous model.
 Episode 5: Models were chosen in random order and picked their designers.  Two models were eliminated in this episode to match the elimination of one designer and the disqualification of another in the previous episode.
 Episode 7: Models are the designers' mothers and sisters; designers could not choose their own family member.
 Episode 8:  Designers chose their models, with the winner of the previous challenge choosing first and the other designers choosing in random order. Two models were eliminated because no models were used in the previous episode.
 Episode 9: New models were randomly assigned in Paris.
 Episode 10: Vincent and Angela were brought back, as were their models. Vincent's model Jia was involved in a bicycle accident and was not able to walk down the runway. Javi, a previously eliminated model, took her place. Jia was out for the rest of the competition while she recovered. All other designers used their models chosen in Episode 8.
 Episode 11: Designers chose their models from the remaining seven, with the winner of the previous challenge choosing first and the other designers choosing in random order. Because three designers were eliminated in the previous challenge, three models were eliminated for this challenge.
 Finale: Two previously eliminated models, Amanda and Alexandra, were used in two of the final designers' collections. Amanda was used in Uli's final collection, and Alexandra was used in Michael's final collection.

Episodes

Episode 0: Road to Runway Season 3 

Tim Gunn and a panel of fashion professionals, which include previous Project Runway designers, interview thousands of possible contestants for the third season of Project Runway.  Previous winners and contestants are profiled since the airing of previous seasons.

One hour casting special before the Season 3 premiere.
First aired July 20, 2006

Simone LeBlanc; Steven Rosengard and Jillian Lewis (from Season 4); Daniel Feld (from Season 5); and Gordana Gehlhausen (from Season 6) were semi-finalists for Season 3.

In the beginning of this episode, Gehlhausen can be seen briefly during the Los Angeles casting call, saying "literally if you give me a sheep, I'll give you a sweater".

Season 7 winner Seth Aaron Henderson, even though not a semi-finalist for the 3rd season, can be seen while Tim critiques his designs as "student work".

Episode 1: Wall to Wall Fashion 
The designers arrive in New York and are asked to create an outfit in just two days using only materials found in their apartments. All items found in the apartment must fit into a large bag and the designer who touches the object first gets it. This challenge requires the designers to create garments that innovate and best reflect who they are as a fashion designer. All of the designers are randomly assigned models. The winner has immunity for the next challenge and cannot be eliminated.

Judges: Heidi Klum, Nina Garcia, Michael Kors, and fashion designer Kate Spade.
WINNER: Keith
OUT: Stacey
First aired July 12, 2006

Episode 2: Fit for a Queen 
The remaining designers are asked to create a formal evening gown for guest judge and 2006 Miss USA Tara Conner in just two days and $300. The winning dress will be worn in competition by Tara in the Miss Universe 2006 pageant. This challenge requires the designers to be placed in teams of two with Tara Conner choosing seven team leaders. All of the designers are allowed to swap models. The winner has immunity for the next challenge and cannot be eliminated.

Judges: Heidi Klum; Nina Garcia; Vera Wang; and Tara Conner, Miss USA 2006.
WINNER: Kayne (teamed with Robert Best)
OUT: Malan (teamed with Katherine Gerdes)
First aired July 19, 2006

Episode 3: Designer's Best Friend 
The remaining designers are asked to create an outfit and story for a dog and its owner in just two days and US$150. The winner has immunity for the next challenge and cannot be eliminated.

Judges: Heidi Klum; Nina Garcia; Vera Wang; and Ivanka Trump, VP Real Estate Development at Trump Organization.
WINNER: Uli
OUT: Katherine
First aired July 26, 2006

Episode 4: Reap What You Sew 
The remaining designers are asked to create a three-piece outfit for Macy's in-house INC brand in just two days and US$100. All designers are allowed to swap models. Four designers are chosen by guest judge Mehmet Tangoren as team leaders, must work in teams of three, and can choose any model in their team. The winning design will be manufactured, produced, and sold at Macy's largest stores nationwide. The winner does not have immunity for this challenge.

Judges: Heidi Klum; Nina Garcia; Vera Wang; and Mehmet Tangoren, VP of Contemporary Sportswear at Macy's.
WINNER: Angela (teamed with Laura Bennett and Michael Knight)
OUT: Bonnie (teamed with Bradley Baumkirchner and Uli Herzner)
DISQUALIFIED: Keith
First aired August 2, 2006

Designer disqualification

Keith Michael Rizza was found to have guides that could potentially be used as outside resources in a closed competition. These guides included fashion "how-to" books including basic pattern making textbooks as well as fashion history books. Keith claimed that although he did have the books in his possession, he never actually used them. Additionally, Keith left production unattended for several hours during promotional filming after a quarrel with the other designers. Keith left to go to his boyfriend's apartment to send an e-mail to Bravo's producer. However, this is also a means for disqualification because he used the internet. Any contact outside the competition is prohibited unless monitored by Bravo production. Any outside documents or materials related to fashion or fashion design are prohibited during competition. Once these claims were brought to the producers' attention, it was decided Keith knowingly broke the rules stated in a signed contract and was asked to leave the show. Keith Michael is the first Project Runway contestant to be disqualified from the series.
After his disqualification, Jeffrey Sebelia and Alison Kelly were the only team who lost their leader in this challenge.

Episode 5: Iconic Statement 
The remaining designers are asked to modernize a look for a "fashion icon" in just two days and US$150. The winner of this challenge will feature their look and model in a print advertisement for TRESemmé in Elle magazine. This challenge allowed remaining models to be randomly selected to choose a designer they wanted to work with. Models then chose a portrait that indicated the icon they wanted the designer to modernize. The fashion icons were: Cher, Farrah Fawcett, Pam Grier, Audrey Hepburn, Katharine Hepburn, Madonna, Marilyn Monroe, Jackie Onassis, Diana Ross, and Twiggy. The winner does not have immunity for this challenge.

Judges: Heidi Klum, Nina Garcia, Michael Kors; and fashion designer Diane von Fürstenberg.
WINNER: Michael (icon: Pam Grier)
OUT: Bradley (icon: Cher)
First aired August 9, 2006

Episode 6: Waste Not, Want Not 
The remaining designers are asked to create an outfit in just one day using only materials found at the Waste Management Recycle America Center in Port Newark, New Jersey and US$25 for materials found at an art supplies store. This challenge requires the designers to create garments that innovate and are judged accordingly. The winner has immunity for this challenge.

Judges: Heidi Klum, Nina Garcia, Michael Kors, and celebrity fashion stylist Rachel Zoe.
WINNER: Michael
OUT: Alison
First aired August 16, 2006
 Michael is the third person to win two challenges in a row behind Daniel V. from season 2, and Kara from season 1.

Episode 7: Everyday Woman 
The remaining designers are asked to create an outfit for an "everyday woman" with just one day and US$150. The remaining designers' mothers and sisters are used as the clients and models for this challenge. Each designer cannot pick their own mother or sister.  The winner does not have immunity for this challenge. Most of the episode revolved around Jeffrey and his client, Anglea's mother, and the problems that ensued between the two. Jeffrey thought that she was trying to sabotage him, and he also opted to go in a different direction than she asked for after criticizing her taste.

Judges: Heidi Klum; Nina Garcia; Michael Kors; and Joan Kors, Michael Kors' mother.
WINNER: Vincent
OUT: Robert
First aired August 23, 2006

Episode 8: High Flying Fashion
The remaining designers are asked to create and model an "international jet-set" outfit for themselves in just one day and US$75. This challenge requires the designers to create garments that travel well and are tested for wearability as the designers are flown to Paris. There were two runway presentations; one in Paris for Catherine Malandrino judging wearability, and the New York panel.  The winner has immunity for this challenge.
Angela is the only contestant in all season who was not eliminated by Heidi, but by a guest judge.

Judges: Heidi Klum; Nina Garcia; Michael Kors; Francisco Costa, creative director for Calvin Klein women's collection; and Catherine Malandrino, fashion designer.
WINNER: Jeffrey
OUT: Angela
First aired August 30, 2006

Episode 9: Couture du Jour

The remaining designers are asked to create an evening gown in just two days and €300 (US$375) employing Haute couture techniques. Designers workroom is held at Parsons Paris. There were two runway presentations: one for guest judge Catherine Malandrino with Parisian models, and the New York panel. The winner does not have immunity for this challenge.

Judges:  Heidi Klum; Nina Garcia; Michael Kors; fashion designers Catherine Malandrino and Richard Tyler.
WINNER: Jeffrey
OUT: Vincent
First aired September 6, 2006

Episode 10: Black and White 
The designers are asked to create a cocktail dress using only black and white fabrics with only one day and US$100. An additional challenge requires designers to incorporate all of the fabric purchased into the outfit. Previously eliminated designers who have won at least one previous challenge are allowed back into the competition and are able to stay only if they win this challenge. Previously eliminated designers Angela Keslar and Vincent Libretti are invited back to compete. There was some controversy, especially towards Angela, who had won when teamed with two designers who were still in. Keith won the first challenge, so if not for being disqualified, he could have been eliminated and still played this challenge. Three designers are eliminated. Had one of the two previously eliminated contestants won the challenge, they would have stayed, and two designers who had not previously been eliminated would have left, along with the other who had left. However, while neither Angela nor Vincent had the worst garment, neither won. The winner does not have immunity for this challenge.

Judges: Heidi Klum, Nina Garcia, Michael Kors, and fashion designer Zac Posen.
WINNER: Laura
OUT: Angela, Vincent and Kayne
First aired September 13, 2006

Episode 11: What the ELLE? 

The remaining designers are asked to create an outfit that expresses "their specific point of view as a designer" in just two days and US$250. The winner of this challenge has his or her look and model featured in US Elle magazine's "First Look" page photographed by Gilles Bensimon.  All of the designers are allowed to swap models. The designers must create a photo-shoot with their models and find three words that best expresses who they are as designers.  The designers are given a one-sheet for their three words and photo to be judged. The chosen designers will show a 12 piece collection during Olympus Spring Fashion Week. This is the final challenge and there is no immunity for this challenge.

Judges: Heidi Klum; Nina Garcia; Michael Kors; and Teri Agins, lead fashion writer for The Wall Street Journal.
WINNER: Uli
OUT: None: All four designers advanced to Olympus Fashion Week.
First aired September 27, 2006

Episode 12: Reunion
All of the Season 3 designers gathered for a reunion hosted by Tim Gunn and Heidi Klum on the eve of New York Fashion Week, at which the final four designers will display their collections. When confronted about his elimination, Keith insisted not only that the books in question were planted in his room after he had relinquished them to the producers, but that he was absent from the production with permission, thus suggesting he was sabotaged, a charge Tim Gunn dismissed as unlikely. Finalist Michael Knight won $10,000 in the "Bravotv.com Fan Favorite" contest.
Judges: N/A
WINNER/OUT: N/A
First aired October 4, 2006

Episode 13: Finale - Part 1
The remaining designers are asked to create a 12-piece fashion collection featured at the Bryant Park tents for Spring 2006 Olympus New York Fashion Week with only two months and $8,000. Tim Gunn travels to visit each of the remaining designers' respective studios to critique each designer's progress. The designers then return to New York with a week remaining to finish their collections in a workroom provided by show sponsor Macy's.

Judges: N/A
WINNER/OUT: N/A
First aired October 11, 2006

Episode 14: Finale - Part 2
The remaining designers finish their collections and all of the designers show and are judged in the Bryant Park tents for Spring New York Olympus Fashion Week with no decoy collection.  Collections were judged based on execution, innovation, and originality. The winning designer received an editorial spread in Elle magazine, a mentorship with Macy's in-house INC (International Concepts) Design studio, a year of representation by Designers Management Agency (DMA), a 2007 Saturn Sky Roadster, and $100,000 stipend to start a clothing line. The winning model is featured and photographed in a fashion spread for US Elle magazine.

Judges: Heidi Klum; Nina Garcia; Michael Kors; and Fern Mallis, founder of New York Fashion Week.
WINNER of Project Runway Season 3: Jeffrey Sebelia.
OUT: Michael (3rd runner-up), Laura (2nd runner-up), Uli (1st runner-up)
Winner of PR3 model competition: Marilinda Rivera.
First aired October 18, 2006

References

External links

Project Runway official web site
Robert Best at Angelicdreamz.com
Malan Breton official site
Bonnie Dominguez official site
Katherine Gerdes official site
Ulrike "Uli" Herzner official site
Kayne Gillaspie official site

Project Runway (American series)
2006 American television seasons
2006 in fashion